The 2015 Liga Nacional de Fútbol de Puerto Rico is 7th season Puerto Rico's top-division football league.

Teams

Standings

Playoffs

LNF Championship Game

Match-day 1

References

Liga Nacional de Fútbol de Puerto Rico
1